663 Squadron AAC is a flying unit of the British Army's Army Air Corps (AAC).

History

663 Squadron RAF had been formed in northern Italy on 14 August 1944, as an Air Observation Post (AOP) unit, and was composed of Polish officers and soldiers. The squadron was to spot for allied artillery units located in that war zone. The unit left for the UK on 10 October 1946 and it was formally disbanded on 29 October.  663 Squadron was reformed as a Royal Auxiliary Air Force (R.Aux.A.F.) AOP unit on 1 July 1949, composed of Territorial Army artillery officers and soldiers. It was based at RAF Hooton Park, Cheshire, with detached flights. The R.Aux.A.F was disbanded on 10 March 1957.

The unit was reformed as 663 interim Aviation Squadron in October 1969 at Perham Down, Wiltshire, from 3flt AAC and the air troop of 15/19 Hussars and 5 Lt Regt RA. It was commanded by Maj Bill Duthoit, the Flt commanders being Capt J Orde and Capt Morley RA. Its allocated mission was to support army formations in the Salisbury Plain area. The unit's initial equipment was the Bell Sioux AH.1 helicopter, with these being later replaced by the Westland Scout AH.1 turbine helicopter. On 1 January 1973 the unit was renamed No. 663 Squadron AAC. The Squadron again disbanded in July 1977.

Following a restructuring of Army Air Squadrons, 660 Squadron was redesignated as 663 Squadron, part of 3 Regiment Army Air Corps, based at Soest, Germany. Since 1993 it has been based at Wattisham Airfield near Stowmarket, Suffolk.  In recent years it has replaced its Westland Gazelles with Westland-assembled Boeing AH-64 Apache attack helicopters. More recently, the squadron has served in the Iraq War (Operation Telic), Afghanistan (Operation Herrick)  and the Baltics (Operation Cabrit).

See also

 List of Army Air Corps aircraft units

References

Citations

Bibliography

External links
 Army Air Corps

Army Air Corps aircraft squadrons
Military units and formations established in 1969